This is a list of romantic comedy television series in chronological order and/or by country.

1970s–1980s
The Love Boat (1977–1986) (ABC)
Urusei Yatsura (1981-1986) (Fuji TV)
Tokimeki Tonight (1982-1983) (Nippon Television)
Miyuki (1983–1984) (Fuji TV)
Who's the Boss? (1984–1992) (ABC)
Maison Ikkoku (1986–1988) (Fuji TV)
Kimagure Orange Road (1987–1988) (Nippon Television)
Life Without George (1987–1989) (BBC)
Anything But Love (1989–1992) (ABC)
Ranma ½ (1989) (Fuji TV)

1990sAs Time Goes By (1992–2005) (BBC)Mad About You (1992–1999) (NBC)Living Single (1993–1998) (FOX)The Nanny (1993–1999) (CBS)Friends (1994–2004) (NBC)DNA² (1994) (Nippon Television)Boston Common (1996-2002) (NBC)Ally McBeal (1997–2002) (FOX)For Your Love (1998–2002) (WB)The Secret Lives of Men (1998) (ABC)Will & Grace (1998–2006) (NBC)The Single Guy (1995-1997) (NBC)

2000sGirlfriends (2000–2008) (UPN/CW)Half & Half (2002–2006) (UPN)All of Us (2003–2007) (UPN/CW)Desperate Housewives (2004–2012) (ABC)Love Love? (2004) (Sun TV, TV Kanagawa, Anime Network)School Rumble (2004–2008) (TV Tokyo)How I Met Your Mother (2005–2014) (CBS)Hot Properties (2005) (ABC)Emily's Reasons Why Not (2006) (ABC)Pepper Dennis (2006) (The WB)Mamotte! Lollipop (2006) (KAB)Men in Trees (2006–2008) (ABC)Ugly Betty (2006–2010) (ABC)Not Going Out (2006–) (BBC)Gavin & Stacey (2007–2010) (BBC)Greek (2007–2011) (ABC Family)The Big Bang Theory (2007–2019) (CBS)Samantha Who? (2007–2009) (ABC)The Starter Wife (The Starter Wife, 2007; The Starter Wife 2008–2009) (USA Network)Cashmere Mafia (2008) (ABC)The Ex List (2008) (CBS)Lipstick Jungle (2008–2009) (NBC)Lost in Austen (2008) (ITV)Prince + Princess 2 (2008–2009) (CTS)Drop Dead Diva (2009–2014) (Lifetime)Accidentally on Purpose (2009–2010) (CBS)Big Time Rush (2009–2013) (Nickelodeon)Cougar Town (2009–2015) (ABC/TBS)Nyan Koi! (2006) (KAB) (2009) (TBS, MBS, CBC, BS-TBS)

2010s100 Questions (2010) (NBC)Better with You (2010–2011) (ABC)Mike & Molly (2010–2016) (CBS)Perfect Couples (2010–2011) (NBC)Princess Jellyfish (2010) (Fuji TV)Romantically Challenged (2010) (ABC)Running Wilde (2010-2011) (FOX)Love Bites (2011) (NBC)Friends With Benefits (2011) (NBC)Pushing Daisies (2007–2009) (ABC)Akikan! (2009)Glee (2009–2015) (FOX)Cat Planet Cuties (2010) (MBS, AT-X, Chiba TV, TV Kanagawa, TV Aichi, TV Saitama, Ryukyu Asahi Broadcasting)Baka and Test (2010) (TV Tokyo)Aria the Scarlet Ammo (2011) (TBS, CBC, MBS, Minaminihon Broadcasting Co., BS-TBS)Baka to Test to Shōkanjū: Ni! (2011) (TV Tokyo)Maken-ki! (2011) (AT-X)Mayo Chiki! (2011) (TBS)The Reason I Can't Find My Love (2011) (Fuji TV) Rebound (2011) (NTV)Switch Girl!! (2011–2013) (Fuji TV Two)Aesthetica of a Rogue Hero (2012) (AT-X, Tokyo MX)The Ambition of Oda Nobuna (2012)Inu x Boku SS (2012) (MBS, TBS, CBC)Mysterious Girlfriend X (2012) (Tokyo MX, AT-X)The Mindy Project (2012–2017) (FOX)Nyarko-san: Another Crawling Chaos (2012) (TV Tokyo, AT-X, TV Aichi, TVO)OniAi (2012) (AT-X, Tokyo MX)Place to Place  (2012) (TBS)Renai Neet: Wasureta Koi no Hajimekata (2012) (TBS)Brothers Conflict (2013)Date A Live (2013) (JAITS, Tokyo MX, AT-X, TwellV, Animax)Destiny by Love (2013)Golden Time (2013 – 2014) (MBS, Tokyo MX, CTC, tvk, TVS, TVA, BS11, AT-X)Kotoura-san (2013) (CBC)My Teen Romantic Comedy SNAFU (2013 – 2020) (TBS, MBS, CBC, BS-TBS)Oreshura (2013) (Tokyo MX, tvk, Chiba TV, TVS, TV Aichi, RKB)Dear Sister (2014) (Fuji Television)Nisekoi (2014 – 2015)No-Rin (2014) (Tokyo MX, TVA, SUN, GBS, BS11, Animax)Gekkan Shōjo Nozaki-kun (2014)Sakura Trick (2014) (TBS)Red Band Society (2014-2015) (Fox)
Selfie (2014) (ABC)Jane the Virgin (2014–2019) (The CW)Crazy Ex-Girlfriend (2015–2019) (The CW)The Disappearance of Nagato Yuki-chan (2015)Sukinahito ga Iru Koto (2016) (Fuji TV)Seiren (2017) (TBS)Clean with Passion for Now (2018-2019)Miss Farah (2019-) (MBC4)Backstreet Rookie (2020)

2020sSeton Academy: Join the Pack! (2020)Dash & Lily (2020)Emily in Paris (2020-present)High Fidelity (2020)Kaguya-sama: Love is War (2019-present)
Love, Victor (2020-2022)
Love Life (2020-2022)
Never Have I Ever (2020-present)
Oh, Mando! (2020)
The Baker and the Beauty (2020)
Zoey's Extraordinary Playlist (2020-2021)
And Just Like That…
Don't Toy with Me, Miss Nagatoro (2021)
Starstruck (2021-present)
Girlfriend, Girlfriend (2021)
Komi Can't Communicate (2021- present)
The Best Man: The Final Chapters (2022-present)
Heartbreak High (2022-present)
Heartstopper (2022-present)
How I Met Your Father (2022-present)
Our Flag Means Death (2022- present)
Uncoupled (2022)

By country

China
The Queen of SOP (2012)
Boss & Me (2014)
Diamond Lover (2015) 
My Amazing Boyfriend (2016)
Stay with Me (2016)
Meteor Garden (2018)

South Korea
Successful Story of a Bright Girl (2002)
Full House (2004) 
Sassy Girl Chun-hyang (2005)
My Lovely Sam Soon (2005) 
My Girl (2005 - 2006) 
Princess Hours (2006)
Couple or Trouble (2006) 
The 1st Shop of Coffee Prince (2007) 
Pasta (2007)
Boys Over Flowers (2009)
Personal Taste (2010)
My Girlfriend Is a Nine-Tailed Fox (2010)
Playful Kiss (2010)
My Princess (2011)
The Greatest Love (2011) 
A Gentleman's Dignity (2012) 
Big (2012) 
Cheongdam-dong Alice (2012 – 2013) 
Flower Boys Next Door (2013) 
My Love from the Star (2013 - 2014)
Emergency Couple (2014)
My Secret Hotel (2014)
Pinocchio (2014 - 2015)
Kill Me, Heal Me (2015) 
She Was Pretty (2015) 
Oh My Venus (2015 - 2016)
One More Happy Ending (2016)
Ms. Temper and Nam Jung-gi (2016) 
Another Oh Hae-young (2016) 
Entertainer (2016)
Cinderella with Four Knights (2016)
Love in the Moonlight (2016)
Jealousy Incarnate (2016) 
Shopaholic Louis (2016) 
Weightlifting Fairy Kim Bok-joo (2016 - 2017)
Radiant Office (2017)
The Liar and His Lover (2017)
Introvert Boss (2017) 
Strong Woman Do Bong-soon (2017)
My Secret Romance (2017)
Suspicious Partner (2017)
Because This is My First Life (2017)
Revolutionary Love (2017)
A Korean Odyssey (2017 - 2018)
The Undateables (2018)
What's Wrong with Secretary Kim (2018)
Gangnam Beauty (2018)
Your House Helper (2018)
My First First Love (2019)
Backstreet Rookie (2020)
It’s okay to not be okay (2020)

Turkey
Kiralık Aşk (2015-2017)
Aşk Yeniden (2015-2017)
Aşk Laftan Anlamaz (2016)

Japan
Sailor Moon

See also
List of romantic comedy films

References

Romantic comedy